Glenvista is a suburb in the south of Johannesburg, South Africa. It is located in Region F of the City of Johannesburg Metropolitan Municipality.
It has a large Portuguese community and a distinctly cosmopolitan character.  
Alberton is located 5 kilometres to the East of Glenvista.

Flora and fauna
Glenvista is beautifully picturesque, peaceful and is surrounded by natural thorn bushes and veld. The area can be noted for its wildlife, which include meerkats and guinea fowl which still run wild. There are also various families of dassies in the area, continuously breeding and expanding, which live in the bushy and rocky surrounding veld. This poses a threat to motorists. Owls have also been sighted in the area.

Facilities
In extension 5, there is a 72 par golf course in the dip of a valley, 'The Glenvista Country Club'. The houses and properties can be large, and land value is high in the surrounding area. The neighbourhood is generally considered safe. It is situated close to a major shopping centre, The Glen and Mall of the South

References

Johannesburg Region F